Lucy Michelle Parker (born 18 November 1998) is an English professional footballer who plays as a defender for FA Women's Super League club West Ham United.

Early life 
Parker was born in Cambridge and played with the Arsenal academy for ten years.

College career 
Parker played with LSU Tigers and UCLA Bruins.

Club career 
Parker signed her first professional contract with West Ham United in 2021. She made her professional debut on 5 September 2021 in a 2–0 loss to Brighton & Hove Albion.

International career 
An England youth international, Parker has played from the U15 to the U21 levels.

Parker received her first senior international call-up on 27 September 2022 for the friendly matches against the United States and the Czech Republic, but was forced to drop out of the squad on 4 October due to injury.

References

External links 
 
 LSU Tigers profile
 UCLA Bruins profile

1998 births
Living people
English women's footballers
Women's Super League players
Footballers from Cambridgeshire
LSU Tigers women's soccer players
UCLA Bruins women's soccer players
West Ham United F.C. Women players
Women's association football defenders
Kansas City Current draft picks
England women's under-21 international footballers